106.1 Kiss FM (106.1 FM) is an adult contemporary music formatted radio station in the Cayman Islands in the British West Indies. The station is owned by dms Broadcasting, an affiliate of dms Organization.

The station maintains studio operations in George Town, Grand Cayman. The broadcast is also simultaneously streamed live on the internet via the station's website.

History 
The station belongs to the parent company, dms Broadcasting, which was granted a license to broadcast on three stations in Grand Cayman by the ICTA on 15 July 2004. On 12 January 2005, the Cayman Islands Government announced the station had negotiated a deal with dms Broadcasting to allow broadcasting of all three stations from a government owned tower, thus eliminating the need to erect a new tower.

Hurricane Ivan reached Grand Cayman on 11 September, ironically 16 years to the day from when the last hurricane struck the Islands After debris was cleaned up and removed, work continued on the station. 
 The first official day of broadcasting was 11 April 2005 with the stations final names being Hot 104.1, 106.1 KISS-FM, and X107.1.

Programming
106.1 Kiss FM showcases a variety of music, including current tracks and the top requested gold tracks from 1970s, 1980s, 1990s, and 2000s.

Notable weekday programming includes Tim and Maya in the Morning, middays with Scott K. James, afternoons with Rita Estevanovich, Chuck Taylor on nights, and Jim Curtis with Boogie Nights on Friday nights.

Notable weekend programming includes Saturday shows hosted by Scott K. James and Logan Blake plus Sunday shows hosted by Chuck Taylor and Jim Curtis.

The station also features live broadcasts at nightclubs, businesses, and charity events throughout Grand Cayman.

References

External links
 106.1 Kiss FM official website

Radio stations in the Cayman Islands
Adult contemporary radio stations
Radio stations established in 2005
2005 establishments in the Cayman Islands